Harris Hill Ski Jump is a ski jump in Brattleboro VT. The event hosts annual ski jumping competitions. The original jump was built in 1922, and was closed for renovation in 2005. The jump was reopened in 2009 after a $600,000 renovation.

The jump is designed around the international standards for ski jumps, reaching an Olympic-calibre 90 meter length. The jump has hosted 9 national championships and the Olympic Qualifier events.

References

External links 

 Homepage

Ski jumping venues in the United States
Ski areas and resorts in Vermont
Brattleboro, Vermont
Buildings and structures completed in 1922